Menglang is a town in and the county seat of Lancang Lahu Autonomous County, Yunnan, China. Menglang is the administrative, cultural, economic and transportation center of the Lancang Lahu Autonomous County.

Etymology
"Menglang" is a place name of Dai language. "Meng" means place and "Lang" means wash. Two words together, meaning a washed place.

Administrative division
As of 2016, the town is divided into four communities and eleven villages: 
Fofang Community
Dashuijing Community
Wenquan Community
Qiankuang Community
Tangsheng
Mengbin
Nandian
Fuben
Dalinwo
Xiagudi
Luoba
Dapingzhang
Kanmashan
Baomaidi
Bulao

History
After the Management System Reform in the Ming dynasty (1368–1644), it came under the jurisdiction of Menglian Zhangguansi. 

In the Qing dynasty (1644–1911), it became the jurisdiction of Mengbin Tusi.

In 1940, it belonged to the 1st District of Lancang County. That same year, the 1st District of Lancang County was revoked and it belonged to Donglang Township. 

Menglang was upgraded to a town in August 1962. In 1988, Tangsheng Township was merged into the town. In January 2006, the villages of Mashan, Bulao and Baomaidi and Donglang Hani Ethnic Township were merged into Menglang.

Geography
It is surrounded by Laba Township and Zhutang Township on the northwest, Nuozhadu Town on the southeast, Donghui Town on the southwest, and Nanling Township on the northeast.

The terrain of the town is high in the northeast and low in the southwest.

The Nanlang River flows through the town.

Economy
The local economy is primarily based upon agriculture and pig-breeding. Soybean, vegetable, and sugarcane are the economic plants of this region.

Demographics

As of 2017, the National Bureau of Statistics of China estimates the town's population now to be 87,703.

Transportation
The National Highway G214 passes across the town northwest to southeast.

The town is the starting point of Provincial Highway S309.

References

Bibliography

Towns of Pu'er City
Divisions of Lancang Lahu Autonomous County